Sally McCallum (born August 7, 1940 in Vancouver) is a retired female track and field athlete from Canada, who represented her native country in three events (4 × 100 m relay, 80-meter hurdles and long jump) at the 1960 Summer Olympics in Rome, Italy. She claimed the bronze medal in the women's 200 meters event at the 1959 Pan American Games.

References
 Profile at Sports-Reference.com

1940 births
Living people
Athletes from Vancouver
Canadian female sprinters
Canadian female hurdlers
Canadian female long jumpers
Athletes (track and field) at the 1959 Pan American Games
Athletes (track and field) at the 1960 Summer Olympics
Olympic track and field athletes of Canada
Pan American Games bronze medalists for Canada
Pan American Games medalists in athletics (track and field)
Medalists at the 1959 Pan American Games